Ensifer (often referred to in literature by its synonym Sinorhizobium) is a genus of nitrogen-fixing bacteria (rhizobia), three of which (Ensifer meliloti, Ensifer medicae and Ensifer fredii) have been sequenced.

Etymology
The generic epithet Ensifer derives from the Latin noun ensifer, "sword-bearer". The synonym Sinorhizobium is a combination of Medieval Latin noun sino ("China"), the Classical Greek noun rhiza ("root"), and the Classical Greek noun bium ("life"). Thus, the Neo-Latin generic epithet of the synonym Sinorhizobium means "a Rhizobium isolated from China", in turn referring to the related genus Rhizobium ("root-associated life form").

Proper name
The name Ensifer was published in 1982 and the name Sinorhizobium was published in 1988 thus the latter is regarded as a later synonym and by the rules of the Bacteriological Code (1990 Revision) of the International Committee on Systematics of Prokaryotes (ICSP), the older name (Ensifer) takes priority. In response to a request that the single extant species of Ensifer (Ensifer adhaerens) be moved to Sinorhizobium, a special ICSP subcommittee was formed to evaluate the request. It was ultimately ruled that Ensifer retained priority and that all Sinorhizobium species be transferred to the genus Ensifer. However, both terms continue to be used in published scientific literature, with Sinorhizobium being the more common.

Deprecated species
Two species have been described which have since been reclassified into existing species: Sinorhizobium morelense (now Ensifer adhaerens) and Sinorhizobium xinjiangense (now Ensifer fredii—though some dissent exists).

Phylogeny
The currently accepted taxonomy is based on the List of Prokaryotic names with Standing in Nomenclature (LPSN). The following phylogeny is based on whole-genome analysis.

This phylogeny is based on a constrained analysis of the 16S ribosomal RNA.

References 

Rhizobiaceae
Bacteria genera